Aphelodoris gigas is a species of sea slug, a dorid nudibranch, shell-less marine gastropod mollusks in the family Dorididae.

References

 Wilson N.G. (2003) Australian Aphelodoris (Mollusca: Nudibranchia): two new species, sperm ultrastructure and a redescription of Aphelodoris greeni Burn. In: F.E. Wells and D.I. Walker (eds), The Marine Flora and Fauna of Dampier, Western Australia. Western Australian Museum, Perth. Volume 2: 63-587

Dorididae
Gastropods described in 2003